Cyndi Taylor Krier (born July 12, 1950) is an American lawyer and politician.

Early life and career
Krier was born in Beeville, Texas, and spent much of her childhood in Dinero, Texas. She attended San Antonio College and Trinity University before ultimately enrolling at the University of Texas at Austin, graduating with a degree in journalism in 1971. Krier was involved with the Republican Party. She received her J.D. degree from University of Texas School of Law in 1975 and was admitted to the Texas bar.

Krier worked on the staff of U.S. Senator John Tower and Counselor to the President Anne Armstrong. She became a private attorney in San Antonio, Texas.

Political career
Krier successfully ran for a San Antonio area seat in the Texas Senate in 1984. In the 69th Texas Legislature from 1985 to 1987, she was the only female senator. Krier was elected to a second term in 1988.

She was elected to two terms as County Judge of Bexar County, serving from 1993 to 2001.

Later life
From 2001 to 2007, Krier served on the University of Texas System Board of Regents.

She joined the San Antonio-based financial services and insurance company USAA in 2002 as a vice president of governmental relations.

Notes

1950 births
Living people
People from Beeville, Texas
Lawyers from San Antonio
Politicians from San Antonio
Trinity University (Texas) alumni
University of Texas at Austin alumni
University of Texas School of Law alumni
Women state legislators in Texas
County judges in Texas
Republican Party Texas state senators
21st-century American women